Marqod, also known as Baal-Marqod (Lord of the Dance), was  a Phoenician god of healing and dancing. His name is from a common Semitic root for dancing; hence Hebrew רָקַד (raqad), Aramaic רקד, and Arabic رَقَصَ (raqaṣa), all meaning "to dance." It is unknown if Marqod was considered the creator of dancing or if dancing was merely the proper way to worship the deity. This may be evidence that the Phoenicians were the first ancient Near Eastern culture to have a specific deity devoted to dance.

References

West Semitic gods
Phoenician mythology